Scott Williamson is an American thru-hiker, most noted for being the first person to complete a continuous one-season round trip of the Pacific Crest Trail (PCT). He is also noted for his speed records for hiking the PCT.

Hiking accomplishments

In 1995, Williamson completed the hiking “Triple Crown”, a coveted achievement among thru-hiker community. The “Triple Crown” consists of thru-hiking the "Big 3" National Scenic Trails: The Pacific Crest Trail (PCT), the Continental Divide Trail (CDT), and the Appalachian Trail (AT). Finally, Williamson completed a thru-hike of the AT in 1995, by starting at the southern tip of Florida, hiking northward on the Florida Trail, continuing northward  to get to the official start of the AT in Georgia at Springer Mountain, then completing the entire AT.

After attempting to perform a round-trip, or "yo-yo" of the PCT in 1996, 1997, 2000, and 2003, Williamson became the first person to perform a round-trip of the PCT in 2004.

In 2006, Williamson became the first person to repeat the feat of "yo-yo"ing the PCT by becoming the second person to complete a PCT "yo-yo", doing it in 191 days.

In 2007, Williamson married his longtime girlfriend Michelle Turley and the newlyweds celebrated their honeymoon by thru-hiking the PCT southbound from Canada to Mexico.

In 2008, Williamson and Joe Kisner broke the unsupported speed record of the PCT, breaking Kisner's previous record-of 79 days, 21 hours and 42 minutes by over 8 days. The new record they set was 71 days, 2 hours and 41 minutes. In this case, "unsupported" means in the style of a thru-hiker, where supplies are obtained by hiking off the trail.

In 2009. Williamson and Adam Bradley broke simultaneously two PCT speed records for both the unsupported effort and the supported (assisted by a support crew for supplies, food and shelter) speed record of ultramarathon runner David Horton. Horton's previous record was 66 days, 7 hours, and 16 minutes, which Williamson and Bradley broke by about 21 hours. The new double record they set was 65 days, 9 hours, and 58 minutes. Williamson and Bradley did their hike of the PCT without taking any detours or re-routes due to trail conditions.

In 2011, Williamson set a new PCT speed record, unsupported, by completing the trek in 64 days, 11 hours, 19 minutes. Like the 2009 record, this new record broke both the supported and unsupported speed records. Unlike the record set in 2009, this PCT speed record was set going from north to south. Williamson finished at the Mexican border October 11. And finally as in 2009, Williamson did the hike of the PCT without taking any detours or re-routes due to trail conditions, nor accepted rides for re-supply.

Personal life
In 1996, while working at a convenience store in Richmond, California, Williamson was shot in the face during an attempted robbery. The bullet is still lodged in his head.

Williamson states, “being shot, coming that close to death, that made me focus more on what I felt was important in my life,” and “if the hiking is very important to me, I’m going to pursue that, regardless of what other people may think. It made me more willing to just follow my passion.”

Williamson also states, “I don’t own a home. I’m self-employed. I drive derelict vehicles I have to work on every weekend, but it’s been well worth it. The sacrifices I’ve had to make to get out on the trail every summer has been well worth it.”

Williamson is married and lives in California with his wife.

See also
Ultralight backpacking
Pacific Crest Trail

Notes

References
 San Francisco Chronicle article: “Hiker travels light, fast on Pacific Crest”
 Pea Hicks' (Trail Name – Girl Scout) video of Williamson's 2004 Yo-Yo Finish
 CBS Sunday Morning article:  “The Power of Walking”
 The Sierra Sun article: "Trail Master"
 Trailcast  podcast on 2004 Yo-Yo: “Trailcast-25: Scott Williamson - First PCT Yo-Yo"
 BackpackingLight.com podcast on 2006 Yo-Yo: “Scott Williamson and Yo-Yo-ing the PCT”
 The Sierra Sun article: “2,650 miles, 37 miles per day, 71 days”
 Reno News & Review article: “Walking tall”
 Fastest Known Time website lists the Speed Record
 PCT News flash: “Scott Williamson Sets A New PCT Speed Record”
 Sign-On San Diego article: "Hiker sets speed record on Pacific Crest Trail"

Living people
Hikers
Year of birth missing (living people)